Central Papua, officially the Central Papua Province is an Indonesian province located in the central region of Western New Guinea. It was formally established on 11 November 2022 from the former eight western regencies of the province of Papua. It covers an area of 61,072.92 km2 and had an officially estimated population of 1,430,951 in mid 2022. It is bordered by the Indonesian provinces of West Papua to the west, the residual Papua to the north, and by Highland Papua and South Papua to the east. The designated administrative capital, Nabire, is the second largest town in Central Papua (after Timika), the economic centre of the province, and the seat of the Central Papua provincial government.

The provincial border roughly follows the cultural region of Mee Pago and parts of Saireri.

History 
After the approval of the bill for the creation of the province on 30 June 2022, controversy regarding the capital of the new province resulted in mass demonstrations in Timika. Residents of the town argued that the provincial capital should be in Timika instead of Nabire, due to Timika's contribution to the province's economy through the presence of Freeport-McMoRan in their regency. Protesters also argued that the last 20 years of the effort by locals to support the creation of Central Papua province was always with Timika as capital and not Nabire. The protesters also threatened to close the Freeport mine by force if their demand to be the capital of the new province was not heard. However, figures from Nabire argued that Nabire is a more suitable capital because it is free from intervention from the mining company on its development and also that Nabire has a higher percentage of native Papuans compared to Timika. Furthermore, six regencies of eight in the region, Nabire, Dogiyai, Deiyai, Paniai, Intan Jaya, and Puncak Jaya, preferred Nabire as capital because it has easier road access. Social conflict between residents of Nabire and Timika regarding the position of the new provincial capital was described by the Rev. Dora Balubun, representative from GKI Papua regional synod, as a dangerous side effect of the creation of the new province. In support for the creation of the new province, Wate tribe granted the government 75 hectares of land for the construction of government buildings.

Demographics

Ethnic groups
Nabire is inhabited by coastal tribes belonging to the Saireri customary territory, including Yaur, Wate, Mora, Umari, Goa, and Yerisiam as well as the tribes in the mountainous areas that are included in the Mee Pago customary territory, namely Moi, Mee, and Auye (Napan). Located in central part of the province is region around Paniai Lakes inhabited by, other than the aforementioned, Moni and Wolani. Meanwhile to the east lie the Jayawijaya Mountains, which are inhabited by Amungme, Damalme, Wano, alongside Dani, Lani, and Nduga (Dauwa) which can also be found in the neighboring province of Highland Papua. While the southern part of Central Papua is Mimika Regency in the form of swamp land and is inhabited by Kamoro and Sempan.

Religion

Politics

Administrative divisions 
The area now constituting Central Papua was originally composed of four regencies - Mimika, Nabire, Paniai and Puncak Jaya. Two new regencies were created on 4 January 2008 - Dogiyai from part of Nabire Regency, and Puncak from part of Puncak Jaya Regency. Two further regencies were created on 29 October 2008 - Deiyai and Intan Jaya, both from parts of Paniai Regency. The new province comprises eight regencies (and no administrative cities), listed below with their areas and their populations at the 2020 Census and according to the official estimates as at mid 2022. The table also includes the regency capitals and a list of the districts (kecamatan) within each regency.

See also

List of districts of Central Papua
Papua
Highland Papua
South Papua
West Papua

References

 
Provinces of Indonesia
States and territories established in 2022
2022 establishments in Indonesia